A partial lunar eclipse will take place on August 7, 2055. It will last 3 hours, 23 minutes, and 23 seconds. It will be the last of the first set of partial eclipses in Lunar Saros 139.

This eclipse is the fourth and final eclipse of an almost tetrad, the others being 22 Feb 2054 (T), 18 Aug 2054 (T), 11 Feb 2055 (T) and 7 August 2055 (P).

Visibility

Related eclipses

Saros cycle

Lunar year series

Half-Saros cycle 
A lunar eclipse will be preceded and followed by solar eclipses by 9 years and 5.5 days (a half saros). This lunar eclipse is related to two total solar eclipses of Solar Saros 139.

References 

2055-08
2055-08
2055 in science